Westbahnhof  is a station on  and  of the Vienna U-Bahn. It is located at the Vienna West railway station, in Rudolfsheim-Fünfhaus District. It opened in 1993.

Art

"Cirka 55 Schritte durch Europa" by Adolf Frohner is found in this station.

References

External links 
 

Buildings and structures in Rudolfsheim-Fünfhaus
Railway stations opened in 1993
Vienna U-Bahn stations
1993 establishments in Austria
Railway stations in Austria opened in the 20th century

de:U-Bahn-Station Westbahnhof